Jonáš Záborský (February 3, 1812 in Záborie, Kingdom of Hungary – January 23, 1876 in Župčany) was a Slovak lower nobleman and writer. He was an author of tales, epigrams, allegorical-philosophical poems, satirical poems, historical dramas, comedies and stories.

His notable works include:
 Vstúpenie Krista do Raja (1866)
 Lžedimitrijady (1866)
 Faustiáda (1866)
 Najdúch (1870)
 Dva dni v Chujave (1873)

Works online 
 Dejiny Veľkej Moravy a počiatky Uhorska. Turč. sv. Martin : Matica slovenská, 1929. 16 s. - available at ULB Digital Library
 Svätoplukova zrada. Praha: L. Mazáč, 1935. 236 s. - available at ULB Digital Library

References

External links
 Jonáš Záborský on SK.WIKIPEDIA.ORG
 Page in Slovak dedicated to the works of Jonas Záborský. (contents of works, texts of works, digitized manuscripts, the history of Slovakia by J. Záborský, etc.)

1812 births
1876 deaths
Slovak writers
Slovak dramatists and playwrights
19th-century dramatists and playwrights